was a town located in Tagawa District, Fukuoka Prefecture, Japan.

As of 2003, the town had an estimated population of 7,831 and a density of 426.06 persons per km². The total area was 18.38 km².

On March 6, 2006, Hōjō was merged with the towns of Akaike and Kanada (all from Tagawa District) to create the town of Fukuchi.

External links
 Fukuchi official website 

Dissolved municipalities of Fukuoka Prefecture
Populated places disestablished in 2006
2006 disestablishments in Japan